Novoye is a rural locality (a selo) in Staroselskoye Rural Settlement, Mezhdurechensky District, Vologda Oblast, Russia. The population was 2 as of 2002.

Geography 
Novoye is located 33 km southwest of Shuyskoye (the district's administrative centre) by road. Yaskino is the nearest rural locality.

References 

Rural localities in Mezhdurechensky District, Vologda Oblast